Iffe-Ijumu is a town in the Ijumu local government area, located in Kogi State in midwest Nigeria. It lies between Ekinrin-Adde and Ikoyi-Ijumu, along the road from Lokoja to Ado-Ekiti. The town is near Kabba.

Chief Bayo Ojo, a former Federal Minister of Justice and Senior Advocate of Nigeria, is a native of this town.

Late professor Ade Obayemi, a professor history/archeology of university of ILORIN and former Director General, National commission for museums and monument is also from this towm.

Populated places in Kogi State